"Someone to Be Around" is a song by New Zealand band Six60. Originally released on their limited-release extended play Six60 in 2008, the song was performed live on the group's 2013 iTunes Session EP. The song was added to the 10th anniversary of their debut album Six60 in 2021, and became the most played song of New Zealand origin on New Zealand airwaves in 2022.

Background and composition

"Someone to Be Around" is one of the band's earliest songs, released as a part of the 2008 EP, written by band members James Fraser and Matiu Walters. The song was not included in the 2011 release of their debut album Six60, however it became a fan favourite due to the band including it in live performances. Band vocalist Matiu Walters considers the song one of the most underrated songs released by the band.

Release

In 2013, the band performed the song as a part of a live session held at Roundhead Studios, which was released as the iTunes Session EP on 20 December 2013. After the EP's release, the song charted on the New Zealand domestic releases singles chart, reaching number 17.

The song was included as a bonus track on the 10th Anniversary edition of the band's debut album, released in October 2021. The song debuted at number 10 on the New Zealand domestic releases singles chart, breaking into the official top 40 chart in January 2022. The song returned to the top 40 singles in January 2023, and had become platinum certified during the year.

At the 2022 Aotearoa Music Awards, the song was given the Radio Airplay Record of the Year award.

Credits and personnel

Credits adapted from Tidal.

Chris Chetland – mastering engineer (for Gold Album)
James Fraser – composer
Simon Gooding – mixing
Six60 – performer, producer
Matiu Walters – composer

Charts

Weekly charts

Year-end charts

Certifications

References

2008 songs
Six60 songs